Géza Allaga (1841 – 19 March 1913) was a Hungarian composer, cellist and cymbalist. He was a member of the Hungarian Royal Opera orchestra and published Cimbalom, his first textbook on the subject before 1889.

References

External links

Hungarian composers
Hungarian male composers
Hungarian cellists
Hungarian classical cellists
1841 births
1913 deaths
1913 suicides
Suicides in Hungary